The diocese of Caltadria is a suppressed and titular see of the Roman Catholic Church.

The location of the bishopric's original cathedra is now lost but it was in today's Algeria, and is recorded of the Roman province of Mauretania Caesariensis during late antiquity.

The only known bishop of this diocese is Vittore, who took part in the synod assembled in Carthage in 484 by the Vandal King Huneric, after which Vittore was exiled. Today Caltadria survives as a titular bishopric and the current bishop is Janusz Ostrowski, of Warmia, Poland.

Known bishops
 Vittore fl.484
 Josip Mrzljak 1998–2007
 César Daniel Fernandez 2007–2012 
 Gregory Bittman 2012–2018
 Janusz Ostrowski 2018–current

References

Catholic titular sees in Africa
Roman towns and cities in Mauretania Caesariensis
Ancient Berber cities